Brother to Brother is a studio album released by jazz pianist Dave Burrell. It was recorded in 1993 and released later that year. The album once again features Burrell collaborator David Murray and a parallel release with Windward Passages (Black Saint). This album was released by Gazell Records. The album is considered "an excellent effort."

Track listing 
 "The Box" (Burrell) — 7:08
 "Icarus" (Murray) — 8:52
 "Dancing With Monika" (Burrell) — 6:48
 "New Orleans Blues" (Morton) — 5:11
 "Brother to Brother" (Larsson) — 7:28
 "What It Means to a Woman" (Larsson) — 10:59

Personnel 
 Dave Burrell — piano
 David Murray — clarinet (bass), saxophone (tenor)
 Samuel Charters — producer
 Nora Charters — photography
 Glenn Barratt — engineers
 Brian Trainor — technician

Reception 

Reviewer Scott Yanow of Allmusic notes that this album is "mostly quite relaxed, surprisingly melodic in spots, and explorative but in subtle ways," almost another side of the coin to the simultaneous release "Windward Passages (Black Saint)".

References 

1993 albums
Post-bop albums
Free jazz albums
Avant-garde jazz albums
Dave Burrell albums
David Murray (saxophonist) albums
Gazell Records albums
Collaborative albums